Sexsational is the only solo album by American R&B singer Tony Thompson of the group Hi-Five. It was released June 23, 1995, on Giant Records. The album spawned two singles, one of which, the top 20 R&B hit "I Wanna Love Like That", became his highest-charting sole appearance on the US Billboard Hot 100 chart, peaking inside the top sixty, where it reached #59 on that chart.

Critical reception

Sexsational received positive reviews, particularly praise for Thompson's vocals, but was criticized for the album's weak material, with Stephen Thomas Erlewine of AllMusic, writing, "when given the right material, Thompson is convincing, but he isn't powerful enough to rescue weak songs." and awarded the album three out of five stars.

Chart performance 
The album charted within the top 100 of the US Billboard 200, peaking at number ninety-nine. It fared better on the US Top R&B/Hip-Hop Albums chart, where it peaked inside the top twenty of that chart, peaking number seventeen.

Track listing 

Notes
 denotes co-producer

Personnel

 Tony Thompson: Vocals, Background Vocals, Primary Artist
 Al B. Sure!: Composer, Engineer, Producer
 Babyface: Composer
 Dave Hollister: Producer, Composer, Background Vocalist
 Teddy Riley: Keyboards, Guest Artist, Composer, Programming

 DeVante Swing: Composer, Producer, Background Vocalist
 Missy Elliott: Background Vocalist
 Mary J. Blige: Background Vocals
 Faith Evans: Guest Artist, Background Vocals
 Joe: Composer, Producer, Background Vocals

Charts

References

External links
 

1995 debut albums
Giant Records (Warner) albums
Albums produced by Troy Taylor (record producer)